Veronika Hryshko (born 31 August 2000) is a Ukrainian synchronised swimmer. She is a World Championships medalist.

References

2000 births
Living people
Ukrainian synchronized swimmers
World Aquatics Championships medalists in synchronised swimming
Artistic swimming at the 2019 World Aquatics Championships
European Aquatics Championships medalists in synchronised swimming
European Championships (multi-sport event) silver medalists
European Games medalists in synchronised swimming
European Games bronze medalists for Ukraine
Synchronised swimmers at the 2015 European Games
Sportspeople from Donetsk
21st-century Ukrainian women